Vintl (Ladin: Vandoies), is a comune (municipality) in South Tyrol in northern Italy, located about  northeast of Bolzano.

Geography

The municipality of Vintl contains the frazioni (subdivisions, mainly villages and hamlets) Niedervintl (Vandoies di Sotto), Obervintl (Vandioes di Sopra), Weitental (Vallarga) and Pfunders (Fundres).

Vintl borders the following municipalities: Kiens, Mühlbach, Rodeneck, Mühlwald, Terenten, and Pfitsch.


Pfunderer Mountains 

The ridges south-west of the main chain of the Zillertal are called the Pfunderer Mountains and occupy an area of about 300 km². The Pfunderer valley is embedded in them. They also enclose the Valler Valley in the west, form the mountain chain with the Pfitscher Valley and extend eastwards into the municipalities of Mühlwald and Terenten. The most prominent peaks in the municipality of Vintl include the Niederer Weißzint (3,263 m) and the Grabspitze near the Pfunderer Joch, the highest peak on the ridge between the Pfitscher valley and Weitenberger Kar, the Wurmaulspitze, the highest summit west of the Weitenberger Alm, the Napfspitze south of the Eisbruggjoch col, the Hochgrubbachspitze (2,819 m), the highest point in the eastern Pfunderer and, in front of it, the Eidechsspitze, der Hausberg of Vintl. A well-known hiking trail is the Pfunderer Ridgeway starting from Sterzing and leading up through the Pfunderer mountains to the area of Bruneck.

Society

Linguistic distribution
According to the 2011 census, 98.23% of the population speak German, 1.26% Italian and 0.52% Ladin as first language.

Demographic evolution

Twin towns
Vintl is twinned with:

  Siegsdorf, Germany, since 1970

References

Further reading 
Paul Gruber: Vintl. Geschichte und Gegenwart einer Gemeinde, Schützenkompanie Bartlmä von Guggenberg, Athesiadruck Bozen, Vintl 1981
Karl Gruber: Kirchenkunst in Niedervintl, Obervintl, Weitental und Pfunders, Tappeiner Verlag, Lana 1994,

External links
 Homepage of the municipality 

Municipalities of South Tyrol